Christopher Colin Dean, OBE (born 27 July 1958) is a British ice dancer who won a gold medal at the 1984 Winter Olympics with his skating partner Jayne Torvill. They also won a bronze medal at the 1994 Winter Olympics.

Early life
Dean grew up in Calverton, Nottinghamshire. When he was six, his mother left and his father remarried. Dean never talked about this with his father or stepmother, both of whom have died. He has regained contact with his mother.

From 1974 to 1980, he was a police constable with Nottinghamshire Police.

Skating career

Dean began to skate at the age of 10 after he received a pair of skates as a Christmas present. His parents were keen ballroom dancers. At school he was captain of the football team and he saw ice skating as a sport that was athletic and graceful. Dean's first ice partner was Sandra Elson. They began skating together when he was 14 and competed as ice dancers for a few years under their instructor Len Sayward. However, despite becoming British Junior Dance champions, the team parted, as Dean and Elson did not get along well. Dean then agreed to try out Jayne Torvill, another skater at the Nottingham rink. The pair were first coached by Janet Sawbridge but in 1978 Betty Callaway became their coach.

Dean left school at age 16 and joined the Nottingham Police Force in 1974. It was challenging for him to undergo police cadet training, as his schedule often clashed with his skating training sessions. Thus Torvill and Dean had to practise during his off-hours. These difficult times brought them closer and gave them a sense of discipline that was to prove vital throughout their career.

By 1980, Torvill and Dean had progressed to not only become British National Dance Champions but were in medal contention in international competitions as well. It was then that Dean made the decision that he could no longer balance his skating and police careers so he resigned from the police force. Torvill left her job soon after, this was made possible with a Nottingham City Council grant of £42,000.

Dean also served as the chief choreographer for the Torvill and Dean team.

Torvill and Dean's free program at the 1984 Winter Olympics in Sarajevo, performed to the music of Maurice Ravel's Boléro, became world-famous. They received nine 6.0 marks for artistic impression, (three more for technical merit for a total of twelve 6.0 marks) the highest possible score and the only time ever that an all-perfect score was achieved. It was one of the most popular achievements in the history of British sport, watched by a British television audience of 24 million people. Since the time limit was four minutes and ten seconds and their music was four minutes 28 seconds, they began on their knees and moved their bodies to the music for 18 seconds before starting to skate.

Torvill and Dean turned professional after their 1984 Olympic win. Under then existing Olympic Games rules as professionals they became ineligible to participate in Olympic competition. In 1993 the International Skating Union relaxed the rules for professional skaters, allowing the pair to participate in the 1994 Winter Olympics in Lillehammer where they won a bronze medal.

Torvill and Dean were admitted to the World Figure Skating Hall of Fame in 1989.

In January 2006, Torvill and Dean began starring in the ITV show Dancing on Ice. Each year, the show runs from January to March and then goes on tour to arenas across the United Kingdom.

In January 2012, Dean said he was open to working with the National Ice Skating Association to help British competitive skating. Torvill and Dean were ambassadors for the 2012 European Figure Skating Championships in Sheffield, England. In February 2014, they visited Sarajevo for the 30th anniversary of the 1984 Olympics, and recreated their Bolero routine in the same arena where they won the gold.

In 2018, Dean choreographed the free program of Aljona Savchenko and Bruno Massot, who won the gold medal in Pair skating with a world record at the Winter Olympics in Pyeongchang.

Competitive results

Amateur results

Professional results

Professional programs

Amateur programs

Honours
On 28 April 1983, Dean was appointed Honorary Freeman of the City of Nottingham. Dean was appointed an Officer of the Order of the British Empire in 1999.

Personal life
Between 1991 and 1993, Dean was married to French-Canadian World ice dance champion Isabelle Duchesnay whom he met while choreographing for her and her brother Paul Duchesnay in the late 1980s.

On 15 October 1994, Dean married American skater Jill Trenary in Minneapolis, Minnesota. They had two sons, Jack Robert and Sam Colin, and resided in Colorado Springs, Colorado. Dean's agent confirmed in March 2010 that the couple had separated. He and Trenary remain on good terms.

He has been in a relationship with Karen Barber since 2011.

Dean also remained close friends with partner Jayne Torvill.

In 2021, Dean took part in an episode of DNA Journey to trace his family roots. He also appeared on The Masked Dancer as Beagle, where he was the fifth celebrity to be unmasked.

In popular culture
Dean was portrayed by Will Tudor in the 2018 ITV biopic Torvill & Dean.

See also
Torvill and Dean

References

External links

 Torvill & Dean (official site)
 
 
 
 
 

1958 births
English male ice dancers
English Olympic medallists
BBC Sports Personality of the Year winners
Dancing on Ice
Figure skaters at the 1980 Winter Olympics
Figure skaters at the 1984 Winter Olympics
Figure skaters at the 1994 Winter Olympics
Figure skating choreographers
British figure skating coaches
Living people
Officers of the Order of the British Empire
Olympic bronze medallists for Great Britain
Olympic figure skaters of Great Britain
Olympic gold medallists for Great Britain
People from Calverton, Nottinghamshire
Sportspeople from Nottinghamshire
British police officers
Olympic medalists in figure skating
World Figure Skating Championships medalists
European Figure Skating Championships medalists
Medalists at the 1984 Winter Olympics
Medalists at the 1994 Winter Olympics